The Tower House, formerly known as The Cottage or Lubenham Cottage is a Grade II listed Georgian house in Lubenham, Leicestershire, England. It is situated to the north of the churchyard on Rushes Lane. Originally a farmhouse, it was enlarged by Cubitts in 1865 as a hunting box for Benedict John "Cherry" Angell, with adjoining stables added in 1852. During the enlargement a tower was added to survey nearby horse racing. It became a Grade II listed building on 9 March 1989.

References

Georgian architecture in England
Houses completed in 1771
Houses in Leicestershire
Grade II listed houses
Grade II listed buildings in Leicestershire